is a railway station in Fukagawa, Hokkaido, Japan, operated by the Hokkaido Railway Company (JR Hokkaido).

Lines

Station structure
The station has three ground-level platforms (two side platforms and one island platform) serving four tracks.

Platforms

History
The station opened on 16 July 1898. With the privatization of Japanese National Railways (JNR) on 1 April 1987, the station came under the control of JR Hokkaido.

Surrounding area
  National Route 233
 Fukagawa city hall
 Takushoku University Hokkaido Junior College
 Fukagawa Municipal Hospital

See also
 List of railway stations in Japan

References

External links

  

Railway stations in Hokkaido Prefecture
Stations of Hokkaido Railway Company
Railway stations in Japan opened in 1898
Fukagawa, Hokkaido